Southwest University Park is  a baseball stadium in El Paso, Texas. Primarily used for Minor League Baseball, it is the home of the El Paso Chihuahuas of the Pacific Coast League. Opened in 2014, the facility has an official capacity of 9,500, with 7,500 fixed seats with the rest being berm and party deck standing room sections.

The name Southwest University is applied as a corporate sponsor, and not as the home stadium of Southwest University at El Paso (which has no intercollegiate athletics program; the university is a for-profit virtual college). Southwest University Park was named as the best new ballpark in 2014 by Ballpark Digest.

History
The complex is situated upon the site of El Paso's former City Hall, which was demolished by implosion on April 14, 2013, to make way for the stadium. Former El Paso Mayor Ray Salazar had filed a 2013 lawsuit to stop the demolition of the old City Hall, alleging the misuse of public funds by city officials, but the lawsuit was dismissed in court.

Ground for the ballpark was broken on May 30, 2013, with 300 people attending the event, including members of MountainStar Sports Group, the ownership group of the El Paso Pacific Coast League team, Pat O'Conner, president and CEO of Minor League Baseball, and City Representatives Ann Morgan Lilly, Susie Byrd, Cortney Niland, and Steve Ortega.

On March 5, 2014, it was announced that the team had signed a 20-year naming rights deal for the ballpark with Southwest University, an El Paso based business and technical school known until 2012 as Southwest Career College. (Southwest University is not the same institution as the University of the Southwest located in Hobbs, New Mexico.)

In January 2017, Southwest University Park was selected as the host site for the 32nd Triple-A All-Star Game, to be played in July 2019.

In August 2018, Southwest University Park was awarded the title of "Best View in the Minors" by Minor League Baseball fans. The El Paso park topped Peoples Natural Gas Field, home of the Altoona Curve, and Modern Woodmen Park, home of the Quad Cities River Bandits, in the voting.

Features
The design theme is based on the Union Depot and incorporates architectural details found in the region's historic buildings, such as the Kress Building in Downtown El Paso. It also pays tribute to the city's baseball history through various forms of art.

Some of the notable features of the ballpark include:
A 360 concourse
46,000 square feet of floor space on the concourse level
24 luxury suites
500 club seats in the Dugout Club, Concourse Club and WestStar Bank Club
Team office space and retail store
Party decks/zones
Multiple restaurants and food stands
Kids Zone
Outfield seating
Diversified food options

References

External links

Venue website
City of El Paso Ballpark Page
Ballpark Digest Preview
Ballpark Fact Sheet

Baseball venues in Texas
Minor league baseball venues
Baseball venues in El Paso, Texas
El Paso Chihuahuas
2014 establishments in Texas
Soccer venues in Texas
USL Championship stadiums
El Paso Locomotive FC
Populous (company) buildings
Pacific Coast League ballparks